The 1995–96 Scottish Second Division was won by Stirling Albion who, along with second placed East Fife, were promoted to the First Division. Forfar Athletic and Montrose were relegated to the Third Division.

Table

Promoted: Stirling Albion, East Fife
Relegated: Forfar Athletic, Montrose

References 

 Scottish Football Archive

Scottish Second Division seasons
Scot
3